The opal-crowned manakin (Lepidothrix iris) is a species of bird in the family Pipridae. It is endemic to Brazil.

Its natural habitat is subtropical or tropical moist lowland forest. This is one of the parent species that hybridized to produce the golden-crowned manakin. A hybrid zone between this species and the snow-capped manakin exists where the two species' ranges come into geographic contact in the Cachimbo Range.

References

opal-crowned manakin
Endemic birds of Brazil
opal-crowned manakin
Taxonomy articles created by Polbot